The 1994 Trophée de France was held at the Lyon-Charlemagne in Lyon on November 15–19. Medals were awarded in the disciplines of men's singles, ladies' singles, pair skating, and ice dancing.

Results

Men

Ladies

Pairs

Ice dancing

Trophée de France, 1994
Internationaux de France
Trophée Éric Bompard
Figure
International figure skating competitions hosted by France